Ma! (He's Making Eyes At Me) is the debut album by Scottish singer Lena Zavaroni, released in 1974 on Philips Records. The record was a hit and made Zavaroni the youngest artist, to have a record in the Top 10 UK albums chart, a distinction she still holds.

Track listing 
 "Ma! (He's Making Eyes at Me)" (Con Conrad, Sidney Clare)
 "The End of the World" (Sylvia Dee, Arthur Kent)
 "Swinging on a Star" (Johnny Burke, Jimmy Van Heusen)
 "Help Me Make It Through the Night" (Kris Kristofferson)
 "Cross My Heart" (Scott)
 "My Mammy" (Walter Donaldson, Sam M. Lewis, Joe Young)
 "Rock-A-Bye Your Baby (with a Dixie Melody)" (Sam M. Lewis, Joe Young, Jean Schwartz)
 "Country Roads" (John Denver)
 "Pennies From Heaven" (Arthur Johnstone)
 "Love Can Make The World Go Around" (Scott)
 "My Happiness" (Borney Bergantine, Betty Peterson)
 "River Deep Mountain High" (Phil Spector, Ellie Greenwich, Jeff Barry)

Personnel 
 Lena Zavaroni – vocals

Additional personnel
Arrangements:

 Album produced by Tommy Scott for Ashtree Holdings Ltd.

Chart positions

References

1974 debut albums
Lena Zavaroni albums
Albums arranged by Arthur Greenslade
Philips Records albums